Paolo Bellardito was a Roman Catholic prelate who served as Bishop of Lipari (1580–1585).

Biography
On 17 October 1580, Paolo Bellardito was appointed during the papacy of Pope Gregory XIII as Bishop of Lipari.
On 28 Oct 1580, he was consecrated bishop by Giovanni Antonio Facchinetti de Nuce, Titular Patriarch of Jerusalem with Bartolomeo Ferratini (iuniore), Bishop Emeritus of Amelia, and Giovanni Battista Soriani, Bishop of Bisceglie, serving as co-consecrators.

He served as Bishop of Lipari until his resignation in 1585.

See also 
Catholic Church in Italy

References

External links and additional sources
 (for Chronology of Bishops) 
 (for Chronology of Bishops) 

16th-century Italian Roman Catholic bishops
Bishops appointed by Pope Gregory XIII
Inquisitors of Malta